Thomas Cholmondeley may refer to:

 Thomas Cholmondeley (1627–1702), Member of Parliament (MP) for Cheshire 1670–1679 and 1685–1689
 Thomas Cholmondeley (1726–1779), MP for Cheshire 1756–1768
 Thomas Cholmondeley, 1st Baron Delamere (1767–1855)
 Thomas Cholmondeley, 4th Baron Delamere (1900–1979)
 Thomas Cholmondeley (farmer) (1968–2016), Kenyan farmer, son and heir of the 5th Baron Delamere, convicted of manslaughter (7 May 2009)